Busa, or Bisã, is the Mande language of the former Borgu Emirate in northwestern Nigeria and northern Benin. It is called Busanci in Hausa, and has also been called Zugweya.

Names 

Busa language can be better known as Busa, but it is also known with the native name Bisã or with the Hausa name Busanci (also spelled Busanchi, Bussanci
Or Bussanchi); This should not be confused with the Busa language of Papua New Guinea or the related Bissa language of Burkina Faso, Ghana, Togo and Ivory Coast.

One person or speaker is called a Busa and more persons/speakers are called Busano and the language of the Busano/Bussawa people is called Bisã.

The Busa people are one of two subgroups of the Bissa people, the other being the Boko people, who speak the Boko language. They are not a clan but a subgroup. They are related to the Bariba people, who speak the Bariba language, which is a Gur language. The Bissa people proper speak the Bissa language, which is closely related to Busa.

Geographic distribution 

In Nigeria, Busa is spoken in Borgu LGA of Niger State, in Bagudo LGA of Kebbi State, and in Baruten LGA of Kwara state. A number of Busa have migrated to other parts of Nigeria, including Abuja. The Busa people are referred to as Bussawa in Hausa.

The Bokobaru dialect also known as Bokhobaru is spoken mainly in Kayama and Baruten LGA's, Kwara state.

In Benin, Busa is spoken in Alibori and Borgou departments. The Bokobaru dialect is not spoken in Benin.

Busa language is spoken in cities like Bussa, New Bussa, Bagudo, Kosubosu, Kaiama, Segbana, and Kalalé, and Bokobaru is dominant in the city of Kaiama.

Bariba, which is a Gur language, is also spoken by the Bussawa.

Classification 

Busa language is the most populous of the Mande languages of Nigeria. It is part of the Eastern Mande group, which also includes several other languages spoken across the Volta River and the Borgu Kingdom, including Boko, Bissa, and Samo.

Bokobaru is a dialect.

Usage as a second language

Speakers of Laru and Lopa, which are Kainji languages, are also speakers of Busa and are shifting and also speak it as a Second language along with the Hausa language, and some Laru/Lopa speak it as a native language.

Orthography 
Busa language has 32 letters (Aa, Ãã, Bb, Cc, Dd, Ee, Ɛɛ, Ɛ̃ɛ̃, Ff, Gg, Hh, Ii, Ĩĩ, Jj, Kk, Ll, Mm, Nn, Oo, Ɔɔ, Ɔ̃ɔ̃, Pp, Rr, Ss, Tt, Uu, Ũũ, Vv, Ww, Yy, Zz) and 25 digraphs (Aa aa, Ãa ãa, Ee ee, Ẽe ẽe, Ɛɛ ɛɛ, Ɛ̃ɛ ɛ̃ɛ, Gb gb, Ii ii, Ĩi ĩi, Kp kp, Oo oo, Ɔ̃ɔ ɔ̃ɔ, Uu uu, Ũu ũu, gw, mb, mp, nd, ng, nk, ns, nt, nz).

High tones are marked with an acute accent and low tones are marked with a grave accent.

See also 
 Bissa language
 Boko language
 Kyenga language
 Shanga language

References

External links 
 Alphabet and pronunciation
 The New Testament and portions of the Old Testament in the Bokobaru language of Nigeria

Mande languages
Languages of Nigeria
 languages of Benin